Magic Touch or The Magic Touch may refer to:

Music
 Magic Touch Records, a record label that existed between 1964 and 1977, initially distributed by Atco Records

Albums
 The Magic Touch (album), a 1962 album by Tadd Dameron
 Magic Touch (Stanley Jordan album), 1985
 Magic Touch (Magic Sam and Shakey Jake album), 1983
Magic Touch, 2002 album by Nusrat Fateh Ali Khan
Magic Touch, 2007 album by John Németh

Songs
 "(You've Got) The Magic Touch", a 1956 song by The Platters, written by Buck Ram, covered by various artists
 "Magic Touch", a 1979 song by Kiss from the album Dynasty
 "Magic Touch" (Mike Oldfield song), 1987
 "Magic Touch" (Loose Ends song), 1985
 "Magic Touch", a 1987 song by Aerosmith from the album Permanent Vacation
 "Magic Touch", a 1988 song by Milli Vanilli, released as a B-side on their single for "Girl You Know It's True"

Film
The Magic Touch, 1958 Hong Kong film which was the first film of Margaret Tu Chuan
 The Magic Touch (film), a 1992 Hong Kong comedy film written, produced and directed by Michael Hui
 Magic Touch of Fate, a Korean film

Games and comics
 Magic Touch (game), a 2007 flash game by Nitrome
 The Magic Touch (manga), a 2003 manga series written and illustrated by Izumi Tsubaki